The 1981 Tour de Romandie was the 35th edition of the Tour de Romandie cycle race and was held from 5 May to 10 May 1981. The race started in Morat and finished in Vernier. The race was won by Tommy Prim of the Bianchi team.

General classification

References

1981
Tour de Romandie
1981 Super Prestige Pernod